The 2022 Tevlin Women's Challenger was a professional tennis tournament played on indoor hard courts. It was the sixteenth edition of the tournament which was part of the 2022 ITF Women's World Tennis Tour. It took place in Toronto, Canada between 24 and 30 October 2022.

Champions

Singles

  Robin Anderson def.  Jang Su-jeong, 6–2, 6–4

Doubles

  Michaela Bayerlová /  Jang Su-jeong def.  Elysia Bolton /  Jamie Loeb, 6–3, 6–2

Singles main draw entrants

Seeds

 1 Rankings are as of 17 October 2022.

Other entrants
The following players received wildcards into the singles main draw:
  Kayla Cross
  Stacey Fung
  Marina Stakusic
  Annabelle Xu

The following players received entry from the qualifying draw:
  Ariana Arseneault
  Elysia Bolton
  Dalayna Hewitt
  Katarina Jokić
  Raveena Kingsley
  María Portillo Ramírez
  Urszula Radwańska
  Layne Sleeth

The following players received entry as lucky losers:
  Paris Corley
  Olivia Lincer

References

External links
 2022 Tevlin Women's Challenger at ITFtennis.com
 Official website

2022 ITF Women's World Tennis Tour
2022 in Canadian sports
October 2022 sports events in Canada